"Never Never" is the title of the only single released by the Vince Clarke project, The Assembly, in 1983.

The song features Feargal Sharkey of The Undertones on vocals; Sharkey's performance on "Never Never" was a total departure from the punk sound of The Undertones. The song peaked at number four in the UK Singles Chart and stayed on the chart for ten weeks. The music video for "Never Never" featured on the video version of Now 1 but the song itself did not appear on the album version.

The song was featured in the 2006 video game Grand Theft Auto: Vice City Stories on the in-game radio station, Emotion 98.3.

Track listing 7"

Track listing 12"

Chart performance

References

External links
 "Never Never" at Discogs

1983 debut singles
Songs written by Vince Clarke
Song recordings produced by Eric Radcliffe
1983 songs
Mute Records singles
UK Independent Singles Chart number-one singles